A melanotroph (or melanotrope) is a cell in the pituitary gland that generates melanocyte-stimulating hormone (α‐MSH) from its precursor pro-opiomelanocortin. Chronic stress can induce the secretion of α‐MSH in melanotrophs and lead to their subsequent degeneration.

See also 
 Chromophobe cell
 Chromophil
 Acidophil cell
 Basophil cell
 Oxyphil cell
 Oxyphil cell (parathyroid)
 Pituitary gland
 Neuroendocrine cell

References

Endocrine system